On 16 June 2019, a large-scale power outage struck most of Argentina, all of Uruguay, and parts of Paraguay, leaving an estimated total of 48 million people without electrical supply. 

By the following day it was confirmed that power had been restored to most of Argentina and Uruguay, and Argentine President Mauricio Macri promised a full investigation. 

The blackout is believed to have been caused by an operational misbehavior from Transener, a transmission lines operator in Argentina. A 500 kV line running from Colonia Elía to Campana, crossing the Paraná Guazú river, was down on undergoing maintenance to repair the tower number 412, whose base had been suffering from erosion by the river. The company made a bypass for this tasks, using a nearby overhead line, but missed to reflect that network grid change in the Automatic Generation Shutdown system (in spanish: DAG), which is designed to alert energy generators of network changes that would require a lower of energy generation. This caused, after a short circuit which lowered demand, an excess of power generation in the grid, a lack of synchronization of power plants, loss of balance, and a low frequency in the network.

In about 30 seconds, a succession of automatic disconnections from the grid caused a blackout that came to affect 50 million users in the continent.

Timeline
At 7:07 a.m. (UTC-3) on 16 June 2019, Argentina's power grid "collapsed", according to Gustavo Lopetegui, the country's Energy Secretary. The failure occurred in the Argentine Interconnection System. In total, an estimated 48 million people lost power. The blackout affected most of Argentina (Tierra del Fuego in the country's far south was not affected) and Uruguay, along with parts of Paraguay. Although some media reported blackouts in parts of Chile and parts of southern Brazil, this claim was denied by the Chilean and Brazilian national authorities. Macri called it "unprecedented".

Argentine distributor of electricity Edesur announced on Twitter at 7:50 a.m. that all of Argentina and Uruguay had lost power as a result of the incident. It caused disruptions in subways and trains, but did not affect electric and non-electric airborne transport. According to Edesur, power had already been restored to some parts of Buenos Aires by 10 a.m.; Edesur reported that it might take many hours to restore power to all affected customers. By 1:30 p.m. power had been restored across 75% of Uruguay. By mid-afternoon 50,000 people had power restored in Argentina; north of Río Negro, coastal cities and the metropolitan areas of Uruguay also had power restored, as confirmed via Twitter by Uruguay's government-owned power company UTE. By the evening, it was announced that power had been restored to 98% of Argentina.

By 17 June, it was confirmed that power had been restored to most of Argentina and Uruguay. Macri promised a full investigation. Citing official sources, Argentine media reported that the outage was linked to a failure in the transmission of electricity from the Yacyretá hydroelectric dam.

Impact

Because the distribution of drinking water was affected by the power outage, Agua y Saneamientos Argentinos, one of Argentina's biggest water companies, warned people without power to limit their use of water.

The blackout had an impact on local gubernatorial elections taking place in Argentina, where the lack of power forced voters to fill out ballots in the dark, using their mobile phones as flashlights. In some regions of the country, the elections were postponed by authorities.

Medical patients who were dependent upon home equipment were urged to attend local hospitals, where similar devices were still operational, as they were powered by backup generators.

Investigation
Investigations into the cause of the outage are being undertaken by both Edesur and the Argentine government.

An independent energy expert in Argentina attributed a role in the blackout to "systemic operational and design errors" in the country's energy infrastructure.

Argentine Energy Secretary Gustavo Lopetegui said it was unlikely to have been caused by a cyberattack.

Preliminary reports suggested that the blackout likely originated from a fault in a 500 kV circuit from the municipality of Colonia Elía to Belgrano, a suburb of Buenos Aires. A second 500 kV circuit from Colonia Elía to Mercedes subsequently tripped under automatic action; the cause of that trip is still under investigation. A third 500 kV line from Colonia Elía to Nueva Campana was out of service at the time owing to construction work.

Aftermath 
The Ente Nacional Regulador de la Electricidad will apply fines to the wholesaler energy distributor Transener. According to regulations, the maximum fine can be either 10% of the annual earnings or 50% of the monthly ones; Transener earned $9,838.5 million in 2018. Distributors Edenor and Edesur turned off 38% of the service, which harmed the situation as it was required a 52% to compensate the outage. Cammesa, the institution that regulates those distributors, explained that this was an automatic process, and that this failure was a consequence of badly programmed systems. Cammesa would redirect the money of the fees to the users, who would get a tax credit as compensation. Those credits would be of a uniform amount, unrelated to the actual time each user was without energy.

See also 
 2019 Venezuelan blackouts
 Manhattan blackout of July 2019
 List of major power outages

References

2019 in Argentina
2019 in economics
2019 in Paraguay
2019 in technology
2019 in Uruguay
Electric power in Argentina
Electric power in Paraguay
Electric power in Uruguay
June 2019 events in South America
Power outages